Chałupy is a village and seaside resort in Pomeranian Voivodeship, Poland.

Chałupy may also refer to:

Chałupy railway station, in the resort town
Chałupy, West Pomeranian Voivodeship, a village in northwest Poland

See also
Trzy Chałupy (disambiguation)